Gatenby is a surname which originated in Gatenby, North Yorkshire, England. Notable people with the surname include:

David Gatenby, Australian cricketer
James Brontë Gatenby (1892–1960), New Zealand zoologist notable for work on structure of cells and Golgi apparatus
John Gatenby Bolton (1922–1993), British-Australian astronomer
Peter Gatenby (cricketer) (born 1949), Tasmanian cricketer
Peter Gatenby (doctor) (1923-2015), son of James Brontë Gatenby; Irish doctor, professor of medicine, medical historian

See also
Gatenby, a village in North Yorkshire, England
Gatenby v Gatenby South African court case

External links
 Gatenby homepage Gatenby homepage with genealogy information